Deh Now-e Olya (also Romanized as Deh Now-e ‘Olyā and Dehnow Olya; also known as Deh Now and Dehnow-e Bālā) is a village in Shaban Rural District, in the Central District of Nahavand County, Hamadan Province, Iran. At the 2006 census, its population was 472, with 124 families.

References 

Populated places in Nahavand County